Marthon Sangma is an Indian politician and member of the All India Trinamool Congress Party. Sangma is a first term member of the Meghalaya Legislative Assembly in 2013 from the  Mendipathar constituency in North Garo Hills district.

References 

People from North Garo Hills district
Meghalaya MLAs 2013–2018
Living people
Indian National Congress politicians from Meghalaya
Bharatiya Janata Party politicians from Meghalaya
Meghalaya MLAs 2018–2023
Year of birth missing (living people)
Trinamool Congress politicians
Garo people